The David Angell Humanitarian Award, in honor of David Angell, is an award given to individuals in the entertainment industry who contribute to global wellbeing through donations of time, expertise or other support to improve the human condition.

The American Screenwriters Association established the award with permission from the Angell family.

Recipients
Chuck Lorre, 2008
Will and Jada Pinkett Smith, 2006
John Walsh, 2005
Sting, 2004
Mary Tyler Moore, 2003

References

Lists of award winners
Humanitarian and service awards